Conquerall Mills is a community in the Canadian province of Nova Scotia, located in the Lunenburg Municipal District in Lunenburg County near Bridgewater and Conquerall Bank which are located on the shore of LaHave River. Conquerall Mills is dominated by Fancy Lake which is the source for the picturesque Petite Rivière. Fancy Lake is home to small mouth bass and the invasive species of chain pickerel. There are warnings against fishing the endangered Atlantic White fish which are rumoured to exist in the Fancy Lake/Petite Rivière system. The community is 125 kilometers southwest of Halifax.

Parks
Fancy Lake Provincial Park
Oakhill Pines Camp & Trailer Park Limited
Bridgewater Parks & Recreation

References
 Conquerall Mills on Destination Nova Scotia

Communities in Lunenburg County, Nova Scotia
General Service Areas in Nova Scotia